= Teachers' Training College of Kruševac =

Serbian college for teacher training

The Teachers' Training College of Kruševac, Serbia, has been operating since 1973. The main purpose of the school to train teachers for work at preschools. Studies last two years (four semesters), after which graduates pass the sixth level of education.
